

Yeomanry Regiments

In the current Army Reserve there remain remnants of former Yeomanry regiments serving, usually as a sub-unit that is part of a larger unit:

Royal Yeomanry
Command and Support (C&S) (Westminster Dragoons) Squadron
A (Sherwood Rangers Yeomanry) Squadron
B (Staffordshire, Warwickshire and Worcestershire Yeomanry) Squadron
C (Kent and Sharpshooters Yeomanry) Squadron
D (Shropshire Yeomanry) Squadron
E (Leicestershire and Derbyshire Yeomanry) Squadron
The Royal Yeomanry Band (Inns of Court & City Yeomanry)

Royal Wessex Yeomanry
B (Royal Wiltshire Yeomanry) Squadron
A (Dorset Yeomanry) Squadron
C (Royal Gloucestershire Hussars) Squadron
D (Royal Devon Yeomanry) Squadron
Y (Royal Wiltshire Yeomanry) Squadron

Queen's Own Yeomanry
A (Queen's Own Yorkshire Yeomanry) Squadron
B (Duke of Lancaster's Own Yeomanry) Squadron
C (Cheshire Yeomanry) Squadron
C&S (Northumberland Hussars) Squadron

Scottish and North Irish Yeomanry
E (Lothians and Border Yeomanry) Squadron in Edinburgh
A (Ayrshire (Earl of Carrick's Own) Yeomanry) Squadron in Ayr
B (North Irish Horse) Squadron in Beflast and Coleraine
C (Fife and Forfar Yeomanry/Scottish Horse) Squadron in Cupar

Yeomanry sub-units serving in other regiments

Royal Signals
32 (Scottish) Signal Regiment
40 (North Irish Horse) Signal Squadron
37 Signal Regiment
54 (Queen's Own Warwickshire and Worcestershire Yeomanry) Support Squadron
39 (Skinners) Signal Regiment
93 (North Somerset Yeomanry) Support Squadron
94 (Berkshire Yeomanry) Signal Squadron
71st (City of London) Yeomanry Signal Regiment
31 (Middlesex Yeomanry) Signal Squadron
68 (Inns of Court & City Yeomanry) Signal Squadron
265 (Kent and County of London Yeomanry (Sharpshooters)) Support Squadron
36 (Essex Yeomanry) Signal Squadron

Royal Artillery
104 Regiment Royal Artillery
C (Glamorgan Yeomanry) Troop
106th (Yeomanry) Regiment Royal Artillery
457 (Hampshire Carabiniers Yeomanry) Battery
295 (Hampshire Yeomanry) Battery

Army Air Corps
6 Regiment, Army Air Corps
677 (Suffolk and Norfolk Yeomanry) Squadron Army Air Corps

Royal Engineers
101 (City of London) Engineer Regiment
2 (Surrey Yeomanry) Field Troop
1 (Sussex Yeomanry) Field Troop
71 Engineer Regiment
Lovat Scouts

Royal Logistic Corps
157 (Welsh) Regiment RLC
224 (Pembroke Yeomanry) Squadron
398 (Flint & Denbighshire Yeomanry) Squadron

165 Port and Maritime Regiment RLC
710 (Royal Buckinghamshire Hussars) Operational Hygiene Squadron
142 (Queen's Own Oxfordshire Hussars) Vehicle Squadron

References

 Current
 
Yeomanry